TMRF Widzew Łódź was a Polish football club. Originally founded in 1910 in the village of Widzew (now part of Łódź), it was dissolved with the outbreak of World War II.

In 2014, it was re-founded by Widzew Łódź fanatics. They won the Łódź I group of Klasa B (8th and bottom tier of the Polish football pyramid) in their first season and subsequently got promoted to Klasa A (7th tier). The club was created because fans of the original Widzew have been in a long conflict with the club board.  Only Widzew supporters were playing for this team, similar to the policy of KKS Wiara Lecha.

Before the start of the 2016−17 season, TMRF Widzew Łódź became Widzew Łódź's reserve team.

References

Sport in Łódź Voivodeship
Association football clubs established in 2014
2014 establishments in Poland
Association football clubs established in 1910
1910 establishments in Poland
Association football clubs disestablished in 1939
1939 disestablishments in Poland
Association football clubs established in 2016
2016 establishments in Poland
Widzew Łódź
Football clubs in Łódź
Fan-owned football clubs